The Second Legislative Council of Hong Kong was the meeting of the legislative branch of the Hong Kong Special Administrative Region Government. The membership of the LegCo is based on the 2000 election. The term of the session was from 1 October 2000 to 30 September 2004, during the latter half of the first term of the Tung Chee-hwa's administration and the most of the Tung's second term in office. The pro-democratic Democratic Party remained the largest party with 13 seats. Notable newcomers to the Legislative Council included Wong Sing-chi, Michael Mak, Li Fung-ying, Lo Wing-lok, Abraham Shek, Tommy Cheung and Audrey Eu who won the seat vacated by Gary Cheng in the 2000 Hong Kong Island by-election.

Major events
 September 2002 – July 2003: The government released its proposals for the anti-subversion law and sparked enormous criticisms from the society. The Hong Kong 1 July marches recorded more than five millions, the largest protest since the Tiananmen Square protests of 1989. Liberal Party's chairman James Tien resigned from the Executive Council and would have party members vote for a postponement. As a result, the government withdrew the bill in later July due to insufficient votes to pass the law.

Major legislation

Enacted
 8 July 2004: Education (Amendment) Ordinance 2004

Proposed
 National Security (Legislative Provisions) Bill

National Security (Legislative Provisions) Bill

In November 2002, the anti-subversion National Security (Legislative Provisions) Bill to amend the Crimes Ordinance, the Official Secrets Ordinance and the Societies Ordinance pursuant to the obligation imposed by Article 23 of the Basic Law of the Hong Kong was introduced to the Legislative Council. It is the cause of considerable controversy and division in Hong Kong. Protests against the bill resulted in a massive demonstration on 1 July 2003. In the aftermath, the National Security (Legislative Provisions) Bill was withdrawn after it became clear that it would not get the necessary support from the Legislative Council for it to be passed. The bill was then shelved indefinitely.

Composition

Graphical representation of the Legislative Council

Leadership

List of members
The following table is a list of LegCo members elected on 10 September 2000 in the order of precedence..

Members who did not serve throughout the term are italicised. New members elected since the general election are noted at the bottom of the page.

Key to changes since legislative election:
a = change in party allegiance
b = by-election
c = other change
d = did not take seat

By-elections
 10 December 2000, Audrey Eu elected in the Hong Kong Island by-election and replaced Gary Cheng who did not take the seat and was subsequently jailed for abuse of office.
 16 September 2001, Ma Fung-kwok replaced resigned Ng Ching-fai in the Election Committee by-election.

Other changes

2002
 Albert Chan (New Territories West) left the Democratic Party on 1 August 2002, a day after the Party's leadership election.

2003
 Audrey Eu (Hong Kong Island) and Margaret Ng (Legal) launched the Basic Law Article 23 Concern Group to criticise the HKSAR Government's legislative proposals to implement the controversial Article 23 of the Basic Law and renamed it into Article 45 Concern Group on 14 November 2003.

Committees

See also
 2000 Hong Kong legislative election
 2000 Hong Kong Island by-election

References

Terms of the Legislative Council of Hong Kong
2000 in Hong Kong
2001 in Hong Kong
2002 in Hong Kong
2003 in Hong Kong
2004 in Hong Kong
2000 establishments in Hong Kong
2000s disestablishments in Hong Kong